The Polish Women's Volleyball Cup is a women's volleyball competition contested every year under the rule of the Polish Volleyball Federation (PZPS) and it considered one of the oldest women's Volleyball cup around the world since it manifested in 1932.

Competition history

Winners list

Titles by Club

References

External links
  Polish Volleyball Federation 

Volleyball in Poland